Soundcraft, SoundCraft or Sound Craft may refer to:

 Reeves Soundcraft, a former US audio and video equipment manufacturer founded by Hazard E. Reeves in 1946
 Harman Soundcraft, a former British audio and studio equipment manufacturer founded by Phil Dudderidge and Graham Blyth in 1973, now owned by Harman
 Conrad Soundcraft, a former brand of the German retailer Conrad Electronic in the 1980s and 1990s